The Australian Game is a breed of chicken developed in Australia at an unknown date, possibly the mid and late 19th century. It is alternatively known as Colonial, Aussie Game or sometimes just Aussie.

Origin
The Australian Game was developed in the 19th century in the state of New South Wales, Australia. They were originally bred for cockfighting and meat production, and developed from a mix of Australian Pit Game, Malay Game, Old English Game, Modern Game and Asil. They were originally called Colonials and they were highly prized as they possessed great courage and stamina in the pit.  However, they were reported to be gentle and tame towards their owners. Their Malay background meant that they were quite leggy and that was highly regarded at the time.

Uses
It is now a popular exhibition bird. but you could have used it for meat back then

Weight
The standard weight according to the Australian Poultry Standard is 5.45 kilograms for males and 4.55 kg for females.

References

External links
 Gamefowl Online - Australian Game Gallery

Chicken breeds originating in Australia
Chicken breeds